Daníel Tristan Guðjohnsen (born 1 March 2006) is an Icelandic footballer who plays as a forward for Allsvenskan club Malmö FF.

Club career
He grew up in Spain and played junior football for the youth teams of FC Barcelona and Real Madrid. In August 2022, he signed with Allsvenskan club Malmö FF. In February 2023, he was selected to the main squad of Malmö ahead of its training matches against Vålerenga and AGF.

National team career
Daníel Tristan has played for the Iceland junior teams since 2021. On 25 October 2022, he scored two goals in Iceland U-17 3–0 win against North Macedonia U-17.

Personal life
Daníel Tristan is the youngest son of former footballer Eiður Smári Guðjohnsen and brother of Sveinn Aron Guðjohnsen and Andri Lucas Guðjohnsen. His grandfather is former Icelandic international Arnór Guðjohnsen.

References

External links
Profile at Football Association of Iceland

2006 births
Living people
Allsvenskan players
Association football forwards
Expatriate footballers in Sweden
Daníel Tristan
Daníel Tristan Guðjohnsen
Daníel Tristan Guðjohnsen
Daníel Tristan Guðjohnsen
Daníel Tristan Guðjohnsen
Daníel Tristan Guðjohnsen
Malmö FF players